Believer is the seventh studio album by American band Chic, their last for the Atlantic Records label, and the last featuring the classic line-up of Nile Rodgers, Bernard Edwards, Alfa Anderson, Luci Martin, and Tony Thompson. The album includes the singles "Give Me the Lovin'" (#57 US R&B), "You Are Beautiful" (issued only in France, the Netherlands, and Scandinavia), and "Party Everybody" (issued only in Canada, Germany, and the Netherlands). The album failed to make much of an impact and shortly after its release the group disbanded.

1983 had seen Nile Rodgers releasing his first solo album, Adventures in the Land of the Good Groove - also largely overlooked, at least on a strictly commercial level. The following production assignment for David Bowie's Let's Dance (1983) album was to change the future for both Rodgers and his colleague Bernard Edwards completely.

Believer was transferred to compact disc and re-released by Atlantic Records/Warner Music in 1991. The album was digitally remastered and re-issued by Wounded Bird Records in 2006.

Track listing
All tracks written by Bernard Edwards and Nile Rodgers.
Side A
"Believer" – 5:06
"You Are Beautiful" – 4:34
"Take a Closer Look" – 4:38
"Give Me the Lovin'" – 4:52 
Side B
"Show Me Your Light" – 3:57
"You Got Some Love for Me" – 4:52
"In Love with Music" – 3:52
"Party Everybody" – 4:51

Personnel
 Alfa Anderson – lead vocals (A1, A2, A4, B1, B3)
 Luci Martin – lead vocals (A1, A2, A3, B1)
 Curtis King – vocal
 Fonzi Thornton – vocals
 Brenda White – vocals
 Nile Rodgers – guitar; lead vocals/rap (B4)
 Rob Sabino – keyboards
 Bernard Edwards – bass guitar, vocals
 Tony Thompson – drums

Production
 Bernard Edwards – producer for Chic Organization Ltd.
 Nile Rodgers – producer for Chic Organization Ltd.
 Jason Corsaro – sound engineer
 Lynn Dreese Breslin – art direction
 Pater Sato – illustration

US Singles

"Give Me the Lovin'"
Atlantic 7" 89725, 1983
 A. "Give Me the Lovin'" (7" Edit) – 3:38
 B. "You Got Some Love" – 4:52
Atlantic promo 12" DMD 693, 1983
 A. "Give Me the Lovin" – 4:52
 B. "Give Me the Lovin'" (7" Edit) – 3:38

References 

1983 albums
Chic (band) albums
Boogie albums
New wave albums by American artists
Atlantic Records albums
Albums produced by Nile Rodgers
Albums produced by Bernard Edwards